The Rural Municipality of Arborfield No. 456 is a rural municipality (RM) in the Canadian province of Saskatchewan within Census Division No. 14 and  Division No. 4.

History 
The RM of Arborfield No. 456 incorporated as a rural municipality on January 1, 1913.

Geography

Communities and localities 
The following urban municipalities are surrounded by the RM.

Towns
Arborfield

Villages
Zenon Park

The following unincorporated communities are within the RM.

Localities
Jordan River

Demographics 

Government 
The RM of Arborfield No. 456 is governed by an elected municipal council and an appointed administrator that meets on the second Wednesday of every month. The reeve of the RM is Donald Underhill while its administrator is Andrea Bell. The RM's office is located in Arborfield.

Transportation 
Several highways and an airport service the RM. The airport is called Arborfield Airport.

The following is a list of highways and roads in the RM:
Saskatchewan Highway 690—East west section of highway south of  Jordan River
Saskatchewan Highway 679—North South section of highway that travels north until it meets Saskatchewan Highway 23
Saskatchewan Highway 23—Serves Arborfield
Saskatchewan Highway 335—Meets up with Saskatchewan Highway 23

See also 
List of rural municipalities in Saskatchewan

References 

A